3-Chlorophenol is an organic compound with the molecular formula ClC6H4OH.  It is one of three isomers of monochlorophenol.  It is a colorless or white solid that melts easily and exhibits significant solubility in water.  Together with 3,5-dichlorophenol, it is prepared industrially by dechlorination of polychlorophenols. Alternatively, it arises via the cumene process, which starts with the alkylation of chlorobenzene with propylene.

References

Phenols
Chlorobenzenes